The Arab Cup Winners' Cup was a football competition between the winning clubs of national cup competitions in Arab nations. It started in 1989 and merged with the Arab Club Champions Cup in 2002 to form the Prince Faysal bin Fahad Tournament for Arab Clubs.

History
After the Arab Club Champions Cup, the UAFA held another championship for the Cup Champions Clubs, which began in its first edition in 1989 as a combined tournament. Its competitions were hosted by the Saudi Al-Ittihad Club in Jeddah, and the Stade Tunisien won its first title to continue until 2002, when it landed its last in Tunis and won its title Stade Tunisien again.

Records and statistics

Finals

Winners by club

Winners by country

All-time top scorers

References

External links
Arab Cup Winners' Cup - rsssf.com
Arab Cup Winners' Cup - mundial11.com
Arab Cup Winners' Cup - naseej.net

 

  
Union of Arab Football Associations club competitions
Defunct international club association football competitions in Africa
Defunct international club association football competitions in Asia
Recurring sporting events established in 1989
Recurring sporting events disestablished in 2001